Bulbeck may refer to:

17th Earl of Oxford, Lord Bulbeck (1550–1604), English peer and courtier of the Elizabethan era
John Bulbeck (born 1818), English cricketer
Matthew Bulbeck (born 1979), former English First-class and List A cricketer
Swaffham Bulbeck, village in East Cambridgeshire, England

See also
Swaffham Bulbeck Lode, man-made waterway, Cambridgeshire, England
Swaffham Bulbeck Priory, priory in Cambridgeshire, England